The White Lightning was the world's fastest electric car.

Two electric motors with controllers and a complex 420 volt battery pack consisting of 6,120 nickel-metal hydride, AA sized batteries power the car. The two 150-kilowatt (201 hp) rated motors provide roughly the equivalent of 400 hp (298 kilowatts). Dempsey's World Record Associates (DWRA) built the car, which Pat Rummerfield, known as the first fully recovered quadriplegic in the world, drove to world records.  

In October 2003, the Buckeye Bullet surpassed White Lightning's record.

References

Electric land speed record cars
Streamliner cars